Bernezzo (Occitan, Bernès) is a comune (municipality) in the Province of Cuneo in the Italian region Piedmont, located about  southwest of Turin and about  west of Cuneo.

Bernezzo borders the following municipalities: Caraglio, Cervasca, Rittana, Roccasparvera, and Valgrana.

References 

Cities and towns in Piedmont